The Houbi Huang Family Mansion is a historical house in Houbi District, Tainan, Taiwan.

History
The mansion began its construction in 1924 and completed in 1927.

Architecture
The mansion was designed with Southern Min style on top of 2 hectares of land over two sections. The front section is connected to the back section with covered corridors. The back section consists of three rooms and the left and right sides have seven rooms each. It has intricate wood carvings.

Transportation
The mansion is accessible within walking distance south east of Houbi Station of Taiwan Railways.

See also
 List of tourist attractions in Taiwan

References

1927 establishments in Taiwan
Buildings and structures in Tainan
Houses completed in 1927
Houses in Taiwan
Tourist attractions in Tainan